The MV Katama is a freight ferry boat operated by the Steamship Authority. The ship is named after the Katama region of Martha's Vineyard. The ship was built by Scully Bros Boat Builders at their Morgan City, Louisiana yard, completed in 1982, and initially named Pro Navigator before being acquired by the Steamship Authority in 1986.

References

External links 
 https://web.archive.org/web/20170829222133/https://www.steamshipauthority.com/about/vessels
 https://vineyardgazette.com/news/1986/11/14/mv-katama-sails-new-look-vineyard-waters

Ferries of Massachusetts
1982 ships
Ships built in Morgan City, Louisiana